Dukhtaran-e-Millat (abbreviated as DeM) is an all-women outfit that advocates for jihad to establish Islamic law in Kashmir and for the secession of Jammu and Kashmir from India.

The group was founded in 1987, and is headed by Asiya Andrabi, a self-described "Islamic feminist".

The Government of India has designated it as a terrorist organisation and it remains banned as of 2018.

References

1987 establishments in Jammu and Kashmir
Kashmir separatist movement
Organisations designated as terrorist by India
Jihadist groups in Jammu and Kashmir